Neocollyris bipartita is a species of ground beetle in the genus Neocollyris in the subfamily of Carabinae. It was described by Fleutiax in 1897.

References

Bipartita, Neocollyris
Beetles described in 1897